Cyclobacterium halophilum  is a Gram-negative, slightly halophilic, horseshoe-shaped and non-motile bacterium from the genus of Cyclobacterium which has been isolated soil from the coastal-marine wetland of Gomishan in Iran.

References 

Cytophagia
Bacteria described in 2014
Halophiles